The Department of Defense National Defense Science and Engineering Graduate Fellowship (DoD NDSEG) is a prestigious fellowship awarded annually to U.S. citizens pursuing doctoral degrees in science and engineering disciplines. The highly competitive fellowship is sponsored by the U.S. Navy, U.S. Space Force, U.S. Air Force, and U.S. Army. These agencies make the final selection of the fellows. National Defense Fellows must be enrolled in research-based doctoral degrees aligned with the goals of the U.S. Department of Defense as outlined in a specific solicitation for research proposals, known as a Broad Agency Announcement (BAA). Qualifying doctoral programs must be based in the United States. The NDSEG Fellowship lasts for three years, paying for full tuition and all mandatory fees in that period. The fellowship also awards the recipient a monthly stipend, totaling $40,800 annually, a $5,000 travel budget for the 3-year tenure, and a $1,400 annual health insurance budget. National Defense Fellows have no military service obligation upon completion of the program. In the 2020-2021 award cycle, 159 fellows were chosen from a pool of over 7,942 applicants, for a selection rate of roughly 2%.

Award history and details
An act of Congress established the NDSEG Fellowship in 1989, requiring that fellows be selected "solely on the basis of academic ability." Over 4,000 fellowships have been granted since 1989 and over 60,000 applications have been received, for an acceptance rate below 7%.

Each Fellow's grant is supported by a specific agency of the Department of Defense. The Office of Naval Research (ONR) is responsible for the science and technology programs of the United States Navy and United States Marine Corps; awarding typically between 30 and 60 fellowships each year. The Vice Chief of Naval Research also serves as the Commanding General of the Marine Corps Warfighting Laboratory (MCWL). The Air Force Office of Scientific Research (AFOSR) manages the Air Force program. Applicants selecting the U.S. Army as their preferred agency may choose from BAAs for the Army Research Office (ARO), Engineer Research and Development Center (ERDC), or United States Army Medical Research and Development Command (USAMRDC).

The $40,800 annual stipend is paid directly to National Defense Fellows on a monthly basis. There are no earmarks or usage requirements for this stipend. Fellows are required to participate in the NDSEG Fellows Conference in their 2nd year of tenure as a fellow. Travel for conferences or professional development may be charged to the $5,000 travel budget, for which the mandatory Fellows Conference qualifies. Tuition payments and fees are paid directly to universities by the NDSEG program office. The NDSEG Fellowship allows awardees to transfer the fellowship title and funding to different universities, allowing them to choose whichever institution they wish to attend.

Eligibility and application requirements
Applicants must be Citizens of the United States (including dual citizens) or U.S. Nationals who have completed a qualifying undergraduate degree prior to the start of the fellowship. In order to receive the fellowship, students must be accepted to or enrolled in a qualifying doctoral program. It is possible to apply for the DoD NDSEG Fellowship while applying to graduate programs, but receipt of the grant and fellowship is contingent on acceptance and enrollment into the graduate program.

U.S. citizens enrolled in dual MD-PhD programs qualify to apply for the NDSEG Fellowship; but pure Doctor of Medicine programs do not qualify. Unlike the NSF-GRFP, It is possible to apply for the NDSEG Fellowship after completing a Master’s degree. Students enrolled in PhD programs which award a master's degree en route qualify to apply.

The application for the DoD NDSEG Fellowship requires students to apply to a specific Broad Agency Announcement (BAA) within the Department of Defense. BAAs outline research and scientific goals identified by a given branch of the U.S. Military, and solicit research proposals or grants. Applicants must identify a BAA that funds the aims of their own research. BAAs may be specific to a particular branch of the U.S. Military or apply to multiple branches. Applicants are required to submit a 4-page single-spaced research proposal, with a maximum of one page for cited work. Applicants must submit 3 professional/academic references, academic records, and GRE score.

As of 2021, qualifying research program areas include:
 Aeronautical and Astronautical Engineering
 Biomedical Engineering
 Chemical Engineering
 Chemistry
 Civil Engineering
 Cognitive, Neural, and Behavioral Sciences
 Computer and Computational Sciences
 Electrical Engineering
 Geosciences (Includes Terrain, Water, and Air)
 Materials Science and Engineering
 Mathematics
 Mechanical Engineering
 Naval Architecture and Ocean Engineering (Includes Undersea Systems)
 Oceanography (Includes Ocean Acoustics, Remote Sensing, and Marine Meteorology)
 Physics (Includes Optics)
 Space Physics

Additional information
The DoD NDSEG Fellowship is often compared to the National Science Foundation Graduate Research Fellowship Program (NSF-GRFP). The NDSEG Fellowship is unlike the GRFP in that it cannot be deferred, and that NDSEG Fellows are paid through a contracting agency of the DoD rather than through the university in which the fellow is enrolled. The NDSEG Fellowship is managed by Innovative Technology Solutions of Dayton, Ohio. The fellowship has previously been managed by the American Society for Engineering Education (ASEE), STI-TEC, and Systems Plus.

Notable recipients
Reid Barton, four-time International Mathematical Olympiad gold medalist and four-time Putnam Fellow
John Duchi, Associate Professor of Statistics and Electrical Engineering at Stanford University and co-inventor of AdaGrad algorithm
Michael J. Freedman, Robert E. Kahn Professor of Computer Science at Princeton University
Neil Garg, Kenneth N. Trueblood Endowed Chair in Chemistry & Biochemistry at UCLA
Steven G. Johnson, Professor of Applied Mathematics and Physics at MIT
Jonathan Katz, Professor of Computer Science at the University of Maryland
Daniel M. Kane, two-time International Mathematical Olympiad gold medalist and Professor of Mathematics and Computer Science and Engineering at UC San Diego
Kiran Kedlaya, Stefan E. Warschawski Chair in Mathematics at UC San Diego
 Mark J. Lewis, aerospace engineer and 31st Chief Scientist of the United States Air Force
Percy Liang, Associate Professor of Computer Science at Stanford University and creator of Stanford Question Answering Dataset (SQuAD)
Po-Ru Loh, two-time International Mathematical Olympiad gold medalist and Assistant Professor of Medicine at Harvard University
Hideo Mabuchi, 2000 MacArthur Fellow and Professor of Applied Physics at Stanford University
Charles Musgrave, Robert H. Davis Professor of Chemical and Biological Engineering at the University of Colorado Boulder
Lenhard Ng, two-time International Mathematical Olympiad gold medalist and Professor of Mathematics at Duke University
SonBinh Nguyen, Professor of Chemistry at Northwestern University
Emma Pierson, Assistant Professor of Computer Science at Cornell University
Alia Sabur, world's youngest professor
Amit Sahai, Symantec Chair Professor of Computer Science at UCLA
Ivan Selesnick, Electrical and Computer Engineering Department Chair at New York University
Kevin Skadron, Harry Douglas Forsyth Professor of Computer Science at the University of Virginia
Salil Vadhan, Vicky Joseph Professor of Computer Science and Applied Mathematics at Harvard University
Lauren K. Williams, Dwight Parker Robinson Professor of Mathematics at Harvard University
Daniela Witten, Dorothy Gilford Endowed Chair of Mathematical Statistics at the University of Washington
Melanie Wood, Professor of Mathematics at Harvard University

See also
 Hertz Fellowship
 Computational Science Graduate Fellowship
 NSF Graduate Research Fellowship
 SMART Defense Scholarship

References

 
Military research of the United States
Research and development in the United States
Education finance in the United States
Fellowships
Scholarships in the United States
1989 establishments in the United States